Liberty High School is a comprehensive four-year public high school located in Clarksburg, West Virginia, in Harrison County, West Virginia, United States, that operates as part of the Harrison County School District. The school is located on Davisson Run Road. The school opened in 1973 after Bristol High, Salem High and Victory High schools consolidated into Liberty High School and its colors are red, white, and blue. The school mascot is the Mountaineer.

Band
Liberty High School's marching band was once one of the state's largest marching bands under the leadership of Michael Perri, who retired in 2003.  The band still performs all over the country and also hosts the Band Spectacular every fall. 2008 was the 28th annual event. Held at Hite Field in Clarksburg, High School and college marching bands from all over the state are invited to perform. The Liberty Band Spectacular is a world-class invitational field show exhibition - an opportunity for marching bands to showcase their skills in a non-competitive environment.

Under the direction of Eric Stoneking, the Liberty High School Marching Band performed in the Presidential Inaugural Parade in 2005.

Athletics
The Liberty Athletic Department has 26 teams including varsity, junior varsity, and freshmen representing the 12 different sports. Liberty offers at least 2 different sports per gender each season in which to participate. The Liberty football team's home games are played at Mazzei-Reaser Mountain which was dedicated during the first home game of the 2013 season. Before the 2013 season, all LHS home games were played at Hite Field in Clarksburg, West Virginia.

Notable alumni
Notable Liberty alumni include Texas A&M University head football coach Jimbo Fisher and former WVU women's head basketball coach Mike Carey.

Feeding pattern
Mountaineer Middle School was constructed in 2007 on the same property as Liberty on the hill above. Students enrolled in Liberty live in the Western Clarksburg area, Salem area and along US Rt 50 from Clarksburg and Salem (Adamston, Bristol, Dawmont, Erie, Glen Falls, Gore, Hepzibah, Jarvisville, Marshville, North View, Reynoldsville, Salem, Sardis, Sun Valley, Wilsonburg, Wolf Summit, etc.). The current Liberty High School feeder schools are Mountaineer Middle School, North View Elementary School, Salem Elementary School and Victory Elementary School. Former feeder schools Adamston Elementary School and Wilsonburg Elementary School closed at the end of 2020-2021 school calendar year and was replaced by Victory Elementary School the following 2021-2022 school calendar year.

Controversy
Transphobia and Discrimination

On November 27, 2018, a 15-year-old transgender male student was confronted in the "boys'" restroom by assistant principal, Mr. Lee Livengood. Livengood had blocked the student from leaving the restroom before questioning him on why he was in there instead of the "girls'" restroom. According to the Associated Press (AP), after the student replied that it is his legal right to use that restroom, Livengood instructed him to "prove" his male sex by using the urinal in front of him. Upon leaving the restroom, Livengood said to him "Not going to lie, you freak me out." According to NBC news, the ACLU's West Virginia chapter stated that it has asked the Harrison County schools superintendent to take administrative action against Livengood. Also according to NBC, the West Virginia ACLU chapter stated that "it is seeking best-practice policies and training in the school system for dealing with transgender students and issues." According to the AP, the ACLU West Virginia executive director Joseph Cohen responded to this event, calling it "a life or death issue." In their report, the AP cited The American Academy of Pediatrics, which published a study in 2018 showing 51% of trans male adolescents had attempted suicide. As of date of this entry, the superintendent of Liberty High School, Dr. Mark Manchin, has not responded to news media's requests for comment. Livengood has since then regained his status as assistant principal.

Student charged with Assault of an officer

On March 11, 2019, a 2nd year student named Robert Talkington assaulted the school resource officer with a knife. The attack happened around 3pm on school property. Robert has not been allowed back on the property since the incident. He was charged with assault of an officer, threatening a school, and terroristic actions.

References

External links
Harrison County Schools
National Center For Education
 Liberty High School website

Public high schools in West Virginia
Schools in Harrison County, West Virginia
Buildings and structures in Clarksburg, West Virginia